Man, Vrouw, Hondje  is a 1999 Dutch film directed by Nicole van Kilsdonk.

Cast
Anneke Blok		
Kees Brusse	... 	Max
Cees Geel	... 	Vrachtwagenchauffeur
Job Gosschalk	... 	Homo 2
Micha Hulshof		
Ad Knippels		
Roeland Kooijmans	... 	Reporter
Ricky Koole		
Joep Onderdelinden	... 	Homo
Allard van der Scheer		
Marisa Van Eyle		
Susan Visser	... 	Vrouw vrachtwagenchauffeur
Nico de Vries	... 	Hans
Dirk Zeelenberg		
René van Zinnicq Bergman

External links 
 

Dutch television films
1999 films
1990s Dutch-language films